The Dakar 4x4 is a kit car - the successor of the Rotrax - though unlike many it is based on a Range Rover chassis rather than the more usual sports car style. Originally developed in 1991 by Barry Chantler of Dakar Cars in Dartford, Kent, they are now manufactured and built to order by Steve Bennett's company Dakar 4×4 in Melton Mowbray, Leicestershire. There are around 120 known conversions in the UK, with more in the Netherlands and also the similar Bush Ranger ("Bushie") in Australia.

As well as the performance improvements from the reduced bodyweight, the Dakar design greatly improves the approach and departure angles of the standard vehicle.

The Adams Rotrax was a RWD 2-seater buggy built on a space frame chassis using Cortina suspension and engines. Dennis Adams, its designer, tagged it "the thinking man's beach buggy". The original Sport 2-seater was later joined by the 2+2 Safari model. 
The Dakar 4x4 stretched the design to match the Range Rover's 100 inch wheelbase and added a rear seat as well as carrying over the V8 and 4WD from the donor vehicle.

The kit has evolved slowly, with minor cosmetic changes, as well as now being able to be fitted to a Discovery chassis. Enthusiasts have also fitted a number of engine upgrades, from a 5.7L small block Chevrolet engine up to a 7.3L with nitrous oxide injection.

The Dakar found TV fame in the 1990s, with a factory-built car being chosen for the series Challenge Anneka as a replacement for the previously used VW-based beach buggy. The vehicle was finished in the series' trademark colours, a light blue body with yellow roll cage and weather gear.

Barry Chantler also designed a small-scale Dakar for children, the design of which reached at least the prototyping/bodyshell stage.

John E Davis Motor Works is an Australian company that make a car called the Bush Ranger that has been derived from the Dakar.

See also

 Land Rover

External links
 Dakar 4x4 - Design &  Conversions - Link
 Dakar 4x4 - Design & Conversions - Home page

Car manufacturers of the United Kingdom
Kit car manufacturers